Dhakshitha Fernando (born 7 October 1999) is a Sri Lankan cricketer. He made his Twenty20 debut on 10 January 2020, for Tamil Union Cricket and Athletic Club in the 2019–20 SLC Twenty20 Tournament. He made his first-class debut on 31 January 2020, for Tamil Union Cricket and Athletic Club in the 2019–20 Premier League Tournament.

References

External links
 

1999 births
Living people
Sri Lankan cricketers
Tamil Union Cricket and Athletic Club cricketers
Place of birth missing (living people)